Robert Reeves is an American novelist, short fiction writer, and literary critic. He is the founding director of the Stony Brook Southampton MFA in Creative Writing and Literature, publisher of The Southampton Review, director of the Southampton Writers Conference, and associate provost of the Southampton Graduate Arts Campus.

Publications
Peeping Thomas - 1990
Doubting Thomas - 1985
Erotic Geography - 1984
The Ridiculous to the Delightful: Comic Characters in Sidney's New Arcadia - 1974

References

20th-century American novelists
American male novelists
Living people
20th-century American male writers
Year of birth missing (living people)